Miss Colombia 2009, the 75th Miss Colombia pageant, was held at the Centro de Convenciones in Cartagena de Indias, Colombia, on Monday, November 16, 2009. Miss Colombia 2008, Michelle Rouillard, crowned Natalia Navarro from the department of Bolívar as the new Miss Colombia. Natalia competed in Miss Universe 2010 being in the 15 finalists.

Results

*

Special awards
 Miss Photogenic (voted by press reporters) - Natalia Navarro (Bolívar)
 Best Body Figura Bodytech - Natalia Navarro (Bolívar)
 Miss Elegance - Carolina Rodríguez (Cundinamarca)
 Best Face (Rostro Jolie) - Natalia Navarro (Bolívar)
 Reina de la policia - Leydi Viviana Gómez (Meta)
 Señorita Puntualidad - Sara Ordóñez (Cesar)
 Best Regional Costume - Leydi Viviana Gómez (Meta)
 Miss Congeniality - Vanessa Garrido (Caldas)
 Zapatilla Real - Carolina Rodríguez (Cundinamarca)

Final competition scores

Delegates

24 delegates competed in the 2009 edition of the national pageant.

Notes
Carolina Rodríguez (Cundinamarca) held the title of Top Model of The World 2010.
Natalia Navarro was in the Top 15 (12th Runner-up) at Miss Universe 2010.
Macry Elena Vélez was in the Top 5 at Miss Intercontinental 2010.

References

External links
Official site

Miss Colombia
2009 in Colombia
2009 beauty pageants